Monascus sanguineus is a fungal species in the family Elaphomycetaceae. It was found during a survey done on water and sediment of river Shatt al-Arab at Basra city, southern Iraq. The research was done by Basil Abbas under supervision of S.K. Abdullah in 1995.

References

External links

Aquatic fungi
Eurotiales
Fungi described in 1995
Fungi of Western Asia